The Indian Coast Guard (ICG) is a maritime law enforcement and search and rescue agency of India with jurisdiction over its territorial waters including its contiguous zone and exclusive economic zone. It was formally established on 1 February 1977 by the Coast Guard Act, 1978 of the Parliament of India.  It operates under the Ministry of Defence.

The Coast Guard works in close cooperation with the Indian Navy, the Department of Fisheries, the Department of Revenue (Customs), and the Central Armed Police Forces, and the State Police Services.

History
The establishment of the Indian Coast Guard was first proposed by the Indian Navy to provide non-military maritime services to the nation. In the 1960s, sea-borne smuggling of goods was threatening India's domestic economy. The Indian Customs Department frequently called upon the Indian Navy for assistance with patrol and interception in the anti-smuggling effort.

The Nagchaudhuri Committee was constituted with participation from the Indian Navy and the Indian Air Force to study the problem. In August 1971, the committee identified the requirement to patrol India's vast coastline, set up a registry of offshore fishing vessels to identify illegal activity, and establish a capable and well-equipped force to intercept vessels engaged in illegal activities. The committee also looked at the number and nature of the equipment, infrastructure and personnel required to provide those services.

By 1973, India had started a programme to acquire the equipment and started deputing personnel from the Indian Navy for these anti-smuggling and law enforcement tasks, under the provisions of the Maintenance of Internal Security Act. The Indian Navy sensed that the law enforcement nature of these duties diverged from its core mission as a military service. Admiral Sourendra Nath Kohli, then Chief of Naval Staff, hence made a recommendation to the Defence Secretary outlining the need for a separate maritime service to undertake those duties and offering the Navy's assistance in its establishment. On 31 August 1974, the Defence Secretary submitted a note to the Cabinet Secretary proposing cabinet action on Admiral Kohli's recommendation.

As a result, in September 1974, the Indian cabinet set up the Rustamji Committee, under the chairmanship of Khusro Faramurz Rustamji, with participation from the Navy, the Air Force and the Department of Revenue to examine gaps in security and law enforcement between the roles of the Indian Navy and the central and state police forces. The discovery of oil off Bombay High further emphasised the need for a maritime law enforcement and protection service. The committee submitted its recommendation for the establishment of the Indian Coast Guard under the Ministry of Defence on 31 July 1975. Bureaucratic wrangling followed, with the Cabinet Secretary making a recommendation to place the service under the Ministry of Home Affairs. Then Prime Minister Indira Gandhi overruled the Cabinet Secretary and decided to accept the original recommendation of the Rustamji Committee to place the service under the Ministry of Defence.

An interim Indian Coast Guard came into being on 1 February 1977, equipped with two small corvettes and five patrol boats transferred from the Navy. The duties and functions of the service were formally defined in the Coast Guard Act, which was passed by India's parliament on 18 August 1978 and came into immediate effect.

Vice Admiral V. A. Kamath of the Indian Navy was appointed the founding Director-General. Prime Minister Morarji Desai inspected the Guard of Honour at the service's inauguration. Vice Admiral Kamath proposed a five-year plan to develop the ICG into a potent force by 1984, but the full potential of this plan was not immediately realised due to an economic resource crunch.

One of the historic operational successes of the ICG occurred in October 1999, with the recapture at high seas of a Panamanian-registered Japanese cargo ship, MV Alondra Rainbow, hijacked off Indonesia. Her crew were rescued off Phuket, Thailand. The ship had been repainted as MV Mega Rama, and was spotted off Kochi, heading towards Pakistan. It was the first successful prosecution of armed pirates in over a century.

The Indian Coast Guard conducts exercises with the other coast guards of the world. In May 2005, the ICG agreed to establish liaison links with the Pakistan Maritime Security Agency (PMSA). In 2006, the Indian Coast Guard conducted exercises with its Japanese and Korean counterparts.

After the 2008 Mumbai attacks, the Indian government initiated a programme to expand the ICG force, assets and infrastructure.

The force aims to have 200 ships and 100 twin-engined aircraft by 2023 in its fleet.

Presen scenario

Current role

The Indian Coast Guard's motto is "वयम रक्षामः" (Vayam Rakshamah), which translates from Sansrit as "We Proect".

Missions of Indian Coast Guard:
 Safety and protection of artificial islands, offshore terminals and other installations
 Protection and assistance to fishermen and mariners at sea
 Preservation and protection of marine ecology and environment including pollution control
 Assistance to the Department of Customs and other authorities in anti-smuggling operations
 Law enforcement in territorial as well as international waters
 Scientific data collection and support
 National defence during hostilities (under the operational control of the Indian Navy)

Additional responsibilities of the Indian Coast Guard:
 Offshore Security Coordination Committee (OSCC) – The Director-General of the Indian Coast Guard is the Chairman of OSCC constituted by the Ministry of Petroleum and Natural Gas (MoPNG), of which the Flag Officer Defence Advisory Group is a member.
 National Maritime Search and Rescue Coordinating Authority (NMSARCA) – The Director-General of the Indian Coast Guard is the NMSARCA for executing / coordinating search and rescue (SAR) missions
 Lead Intelligence Agency (LIA) – For coastal and sea borders
 Coastal Security – The Director-General of the Indian Coast Guard is the commander of coastal command and is responsible for overall coordination between central and state agencies in all matters relating to coastal security

Leadership and organisation

The Indian Coast Guard organisation is headed by the Director-General (DG ICG) who is located at Coast Guard Headquarters (CGHQ), New Delhi. At CGHQ, he is assisted by four Deputy Director-Generals of the rank of Inspector-General, and other senior officers heading various staff divisions. The current Director-General is Virender Singh Pathania, PTM, TM.

Director-General of Indian Coast Guard is equivalent to Vice admiral of Indian Navy.

The Indian Coast Guard operates five regions. Each region is headed by an officer of the rank of Inspector-General. Each of the regions is further divided into multiple districts, typically covering a coastal state or a union territory.

By the end of 2012, the Indian Coast Guard is on track to operate:
 42 Coast Guard Stations
 5 Coast Guard Air Stations
 10 Coast Guard Air Enclaves

Organization 
There are currently 42 Coast Guard stations which have been established along the coastline of the country.

Personnel

Officer rank structure
A table showing the rank structure of Coast Guard officers with those of the other Indian armed services.

Coast Guard officers

The naming of ranks of officers in the Coast Guard is as same as rank of Central Armed Police Forces. Officers are appointed in the Coast Guard in one of four branches, as either General-Duty officer, Pilot officer, Technical officer or Law officers. Lady Officers have two branches i.e. General-Duty Officer or Pilot Officer and serve on shore establishments/Air Stations/Headquarters. They are not deployed on board Indian Coast Guard ships.

Currently, officers of Indian Coast Guard undergo Basic Military Training at the Indian Naval Academy, Ezhimala along with their counterparts of Indian Navy. This helps in the mutual interchange of Officers among these two sister services. While the Indian Coast Guard Academy is under construction in Mangalore, Dakshina Kannada district, Karnataka.

General-Duty Officers
The command of ships at sea can only be exercised by officers of the General-Duty (GD) branch. The key functions of a General-Duty Officer would be to operate weapons, sensors and different kinds of equipment on board a ship. The safety of the ship and the men would be GD officers responsibility. All the District Commanders (COMDIS) and Commander of Coast Guard Region (COMCG) appointments are exercised by a GD Officer of the Indian Coast Guard.

Pilot Officers
Pilot Officers are also part of GD branch. A Pilot Officer gets an opportunity to work at shore Air Stations along the Indian coasts and also embark ships. ICG operates fixed wing aircraft for surveillance of the Exclusive Economic Zone. In addition, helicopters are embarked on Coast Guard Offshore Patrol Vessels (OPV) to provide local surveillance and perform search and rescue mission at sea.

Technical Officers
Technical Officers are responsible for operation of advanced technology and sensor systems on board Coast Guard vessels and aircraft, as well as on shore installations. They also command the maintenance wings of the force.

Law Officers
Law Officers act as legal advisers to their respective commanders. They represent the Indian Coast Guard in legal actions filed by or against the organisation. They also perform the duties of trial law officers in Coast Guard courts, convened to try delinquent Coast Guard personnel. The Directorate of Law at Coast Guard Headquarters is headed by a Deputy Inspector-General and is designated as the Chief Law Officer. Section 115 of the Coast Guard Act, 1978 deals with the qualifications necessary to be appointed as the Chief Law Officer of Indian Coast Guard. Section 116 of the Coast Guard Act, 1978 defines the functions of the Chief Law Officer.

Enrolled personnel 
Enrolled personnel in the Coast Guard serve as either a yantrik (technician) or navik (sailor).
Yantriks are responsible for operating and maintaining mechanical, electrical or aeronautical equipment and systems on board the Coast Guard vessels and aircraft.
Naviks may further serve in the General-Duty or Domestic branches. The General-Duty naviks serve as sailors, weapons systems operators, communication specialists, divers, etc. or in specific maritime or aviation support roles. Domestic branch naviks serve in roles such as stewards, cooks, etc. on board Coast Guard vessels.

Enrolled personnel of Indian Coast Guard are trained along with Indian Naval sailors at the naval training establishment INS Chilka. All training undertaken by Coast Guard personnel is the same as those undertaken by sailors in the Indian Navy. All personnel are trained in operation of weapons systems in cases of emergency.

Rank insignia 
Officers

Other ranks

Equipment

Current aircraft

Current vessels
Vessels belonging to the Indian Coast Guard bear the prefix "ICGS" – Indian Coast Guard Ship.

Former vessels
Vessels belonging to the Indian Coast Guard bear the prefix "ICGS" – Indian Coast Guard Ship.

Future of the Indian Coast Guard

Future vessels
The following is a table of vessel classes which are either under construction or planned, but have not yet entered service.

Future aircraft

See also

 Coastal India
 Exclusive economic zone of India
 List of Indian Coast Guard directors general
 Indian Navy
 Indian Naval Academy
 Indian Coast Guard Academy
 Indian Army
 Indian Air Force
 Military of India
 Paramilitary forces of India
 Central Armed Police Forces
 Sagar Prahari Bal

References

External links

 

 
Coast Guard
Coast guards
Defence agencies of India
Sea rescue organizations
Federal law enforcement agencies of India
1978 establishments in India
Units of the Indian Peace Keeping Force